Mary Wickes (born Mary Isabella Wickenhauser; June 13, 1910 – October 22, 1995) was an American actress. She often played supporting roles as prim, professional women, secretaries, nurses, nuns, therapists, teachers and housekeepers, who made sarcastic quips when the leading characters fell short of her high standards.

Early life
Wickes was born to Frank Wickenhauser and his wife Mary Isabella (née Shannon) in St. Louis, Missouri of German, Scottish, and Irish extraction, and raised Protestant. Her parents were theater buffs, and took her to plays from the time that she could stay awake through a matinee. An excellent student, she skipped two grades and graduated at 16 from Beaumont High School. She was accepted into Washington University in St. Louis, where she joined the debate team and the Phi Mu sorority, and was initiated into Mortar Board in 1929. She graduated in 1930 with a double major in English literature and political science. Although she had planned a career in law, a favorite professor encouraged her to try drama, and she shifted direction.

Career

Wickes's first Broadway appearance was in Marc Connelly's The Farmer Takes a Wife in 1934 with Henry Fonda. She began acting in films in the late 1930s and was a member of the Orson Welles troupe on his radio drama The Mercury Theatre on the Air; she also appeared in Welles's film Too Much Johnson (1938). One of her earlier significant film appearances was in The Man Who Came to Dinner (1942), reprising her stage role of Nurse Preen.

A tall woman with a distinctive voice, Wickes would ultimately prove to be an adept comedienne. She attracted attention in Now, Voyager (1942) as the wisecracking nurse who helped Bette Davis's character during her mother's illness. She had already appeared earlier that year with Davis in The Man Who Came To Dinner, and joined her again six years later in June Bride. (Wickes and Davis also reteamed in 1965 when Wickes played a supporting role to Davis in a television pilot, The Decorator.) 

In 1942, she also had a large part in the Abbott and Costello comedy Who Done It? She continued playing supporting roles in films during the next decade, usually playing wisecracking characters. A prime example was her deadpan characterization of the harassed housekeeper in the Doris Day vehicles On Moonlight Bay and By the Light of the Silvery Moon, a character type she would repeat in the holiday classic White Christmas (1954), starring Bing Crosby, Danny Kaye, Rosemary Clooney, and Vera-Ellen. She played similar roles in two later movies with Rosalind Russell in the 1960s: The Trouble with Angels and Where Angels Go, Trouble Follows.

Wickes moved to the new medium of television in 1949, starring in the title role of a Westinghouse Studio One version of Mary Poppins. In the 1950s, Wickes played the warm yet jocular maid Katie in the Mickey Mouse Club serial Annette and regular roles in the sitcoms Make Room for Daddy and Dennis the Menace. She also played the part of a ballet teacher, Madame Lamond, in the I Love Lucy episode "The Ballet" (1952). Wickes also served as the live-action reference model for Cruella De Vil in Walt Disney's One Hundred and One Dalmatians (1961), and played Mrs. Squires in the film adaptation of Meredith Willson's The Music Man (1962).  In 1953, Wickes played Martha the housekeeper to Ezio Pinza's character in the short-lived Bonino. In 1954–55, she played Alice on The Halls of Ivy, starring Ronald Colman.

In 1956, Wickes appeared with Thelma Ritter in "The Babysitter" episode of Alfred Hitchcock Presents. Wickes also appeared in two episodes of Zorro. In the 1961–62 season, she appeared as Maxfield opposite Gertrude Berg and Cedric Hardwicke in Mrs. G. Goes to College. For her work in the sitcom, Wickes was nominated for an Emmy Award for "Outstanding Performance in a Supporting Role by an Actress". In 1964, she appeared on The Donna Reed Show in the episode "First Addition".

In 1964, she appeared as Ida Goff in five episodes of the series Temple Houston, with Jeffrey Hunter as a historical figure, the frontier lawyer Temple Lea Houston, youngest son of Sam Houston. She played Adeline Ashley in a 1967 episode of The Beverly Hillbillies, "The Social Climbers".

A longtime friend of Lucille Ball, Wickes played frequent guest roles on I Love Lucy, The Lucy Show, and Here's Lucy. In 1970–71, she guest starred on The Doris Day Show. (Day was another of her friends.) She was also a regular on the Sid and Marty Krofft children's television show Sigmund and the Sea Monsters and the sitcom Doc. She made numerous appearances as a celebrity panelist on the game show Match Game. By the 1980s, her appearances in television series such as Our Man Higgins, M*A*S*H, Columbo, The Love Boat, Kolchak: The Night Stalker, and Murder, She Wrote had made her a widely recognizable character actress. She also appeared in a variety of Broadway shows, including a 1979 revival of Oklahoma! as Aunt Eller, for which she received rave reviews.

Wickes's career had a resurgence in the late 1980s and 1990s. She was cast as the mother of Shirley MacLaine's character in the film Postcards from the Edge (1990) and portrayed Marie Murkin in the television movie and series adaptations of The Father Dowling Mysteries (1989–1991). She played one of her most notable roles in these years when she was cast as Sister Mary Lazarus in Sister Act (1992) and in the sequel Sister Act 2: Back in the Habit (1993). She appeared in the 1994 film version of Little Women before she became ill.

Death and legacy
Wickes suffered from numerous ailments in the last years of her life that cumulatively resulted in her hospitalization, where she fell and broke her hip, prompting surgery. She died of complications following the surgery on October 22, 1995, at the age of 85 at the UCLA Medical Center in Los Angeles.

Her final film role, voicing Laverne in Disney's animated feature The Hunchback of Notre Dame, was released posthumously in 1996. Wickes reportedly had only one voice recording session left for the film when she died. Jane Withers came in to finish the character's remaining six lines of dialogue.

She was interred beside her parents at the Shiloh Valley Cemetery in Shiloh, Illinois. Wickes was inducted posthumously into the St. Louis Walk of Fame in 2004.

Personal life
Wickes left a large estate and made a $2 million bequest in memory of her parents, establishing the Isabella and Frank Wickenhauser Memorial Library Fund for Television, Film and Theater Arts at Washington University in St. Louis. Wickes was a lifelong Republican.

Filmography

Film

Short films

Television

Awards and nominations

References

External links

 
 
 
 
 Washington University Library Site - Papers of Mary Wickes
 Wickes' Entry on the St. Louis Walk of Fame
 

1910 births
1995 deaths
American film actresses
American musical theatre actresses
American stage actresses
American radio actresses
American television actresses
American philanthropists
American people of German descent
American people of Scottish descent
American people of Irish descent
American Protestants
Deaths from kidney failure
Actresses from St. Louis
Washington University in St. Louis alumni
20th-century American actresses
20th-century American singers
California Republicans
20th-century American women singers